

Overview
Simple DNS Plus is a DNS server software product that runs on x86 and x64 editions of Windows operating system.

All options and settings are available directly from a Windows user interface.
It provides wizards for common tasks such as setting up new zones, importing data, making bulk updates, etc.

It has full support for IPv6. It has an option to control protocol preference (IPv4 / IPv6) on dual-stack computers, and it can even act as IPv6-to-IPv4 or IPv4-to-IPv6 forwarder.

It has full support for internationalized domain names (IDNs). You can enter domain names with native characters directly (no punycode conversion needed), and have an option to display native character or punycoded domain names anywhere in the user interface, and quickly switch between these modes.

You can create DNS records or entire zone files from other applications or web-sites and prompt Simple DNS Plus to dynamically load and use this through command line options, a simple HTTP API, and a full .NET/COM programming API.

Simple DNS Plus is based on the Microsoft .NET Framework 4.8 and is 100% managed code, protecting it from common security issues such as buffer overruns, and making it run natively on both 32 bit and 64 bit CPUs and Windows versions, including Windows Vista.

History / Versions

Version numbers, date released, and new feature highlights

Version 1.00 - 3 June 1999
 First official release

Version 2.00 - 10 December 1999
 Binding to specific local IP addresses
 Limit recursion to one or more IP address ranges
 IP address blocking
 Support for AAAA and SRV records
 Run as NT/Windows service
 Reverse zone wizard 
 Wildcard records 
 Standard zone transfers
 Cache snapshot viewer

Version 3.00 - 24 August 2000
 Import wizard
 Zone file sharing
 Support for HINFO, MB, MG, MINFO, MR AFSDB, ISDN, RP, RT, X25, NSAP, and ATMA records
 Standard Zone files compatible with BIND
 Command line options

Version 3.20 - 2 April 2001
 Super Master/Slave
 HTTP API
 Dynamic updates
 Incremental zone transfers
 Support for A6, DNAME records

Version 3.50 - 3 October 2003
 Separation of service and GUI
 NXDOMAIN redirect
 Support for LOC, NAPTR records

Version 3.60 - 27 June 2004
 TSIG signed dynamic updates
 Domain specific forwarding
 Stealth DNS

Version 4.00 - 10 April 2005
 Automatic SPF records
 NAT IP Alias
 Record and zone comments
 Bulk update wizard
 Zone groups

Version 5.0 - 17 January 2008
Version 5.0 was re-written for the .NET Framework 2.0
 Windows Vista / Windows Server 2008 support
 IPv6 support
 IDN support
 Plug-in system
 Quick Zone Templates

Version 5.1 - 8 July 2008
 Suspending zones
 Remote logging to syslog server
 Response Filtering to prevent DNS rebinding attacks

Version 5.2 - 23 April 2009
 Windows 7 / Windows server core support
 Remote Management
 DNSSEC hosting
 Secure Zone Transfers (TSIG signed)
 Check Internet Delegations wizard
 Windows Performance Counters
 DNS request "rules" for plug-ins

Version 5.3 - 27 October 2015
 ALIAS-records (Auto Resolved Alias)
 DNS0x20
 HTTP API can share port 80 / domain / partial URL with IIS
 New authentication options for HTTP API
 CERT-records (Certificate / CRL)
 TLSA-records (Transport Layer Security Authentication)

Version 6.0 - 20 April 2016
 Zone version control
 All DNS data and program settings in single database file
 View/Save as standard zone file
 Export standard boot file and zone files
 SHA-256 and SHA-512 in DNSSEC signatures
 SHA-256 and SHA-384 hashes in DNSSEC DS-records
 CAA-records (Certification Authority Authorization)

Version 7.0 - 19 May 2018
 New HTTP API (v. 2)
 HTTP API - CORS support
 HTTP API - SSL support
 HTTP API - debugging log files
 New zone account-ID setting
 Import zones from a Simple DNS Plus v. 6.0 / 7.x database file
 Enhanced auto IP address blocking

Version 8.0 - 2 July 2018
 Automatic DNSSEC signing
 Automatic DNSSEC ZSK rollover
 On-line DNSSEC keys
 Scheduled automatic deletion of on-line DNSSEC keys
 Combining on-line and off-line DNSSEC keys
 New function to remove/disable DNSSEC for a zone
 DNSSEC records hidden in GUI
 New HTTP API commands for DNSSEC

Version 9.0 - 28 September 2021
 DNS over TLS (DoT) and DNS over HTTPS (DoH)
 New "Bind SSL certificate" helper function
 "HTTPS" DNS record type

Version 9.1 - 28 October 2021
 JavaScript plug-in
 New asynchronous plug-in interface
 Plug-in query order enhanced

See also
 Comparison of DNS server software

External links
 Simple DNS Plus
 Don Moore's May 2004 DNS Internet survey
 András Salamon's DNS Resources Directory

DNS software